Mary Jane McLean  (4 April 1866 – 9 February 1949) was a New Zealand school principal. She was born in Timaru, New Zealand, on 4 April 1866. She was principal of Wellington Girls' College from 1900 to 1926, when she retired. She was appointed a Commander of the Order of the British Empire (CBE) in the 1928 King's Birthday Honours.

References

1866 births
1949 deaths
New Zealand schoolteachers
New Zealand Commanders of the Order of the British Empire
Heads of schools in New Zealand
People from Timaru